Dactyloscopus lunaticus, the moonstruck stargazer, is a species of sand stargazer native to the Pacific coast of Central America from southern Baja California to the Gulf of Panama where it can be found at depths down to .

References

lunaticus
Taxa named by Charles Henry Gilbert
Fish described in 1890